Rao Vihar, Nangloi  is a Yadav dominated urban town located in the Nangloi, West District of Delhi, India. It was originally first settled by JGAT BHADUR AND FAMILY since 1980. It falls under the administrative area of Punjabi Bagh tehsil and is on National Highway 10 (Rohtak Road, Delhi). A Yadav of this town is also known as a Rao.

Villages in West Delhi district